Zgornje Vrtiče is a settlement in the Municipality of Kungota in the western part of the Slovene Hills in northeastern Slovenia.

References

External links
Zgornje Vrtiče on Geopedia

Populated places in the Municipality of Kungota